Xiangyang Mountain is a mountain in Kaohsiung, Taiwan with an elevation of .

See also
List of mountains in Taiwan

References

Landforms of Kaohsiung 
Mountains of Taiwan